Ji Sang-jun (born December 12, 1973) is a retired male backstroke and freestyle swimmer from South Korea, who represented his native country at two consecutive Summer Olympics, starting in Barcelona, Spain (1992). He is best known for winning a gold medal at the 1995 Summer Universiade in Fukuoka, Japan.

References
 sports-reference

1973 births
Living people
South Korean male backstroke swimmers
South Korean male freestyle swimmers
Olympic swimmers of South Korea
Swimmers at the 1992 Summer Olympics
Swimmers at the 1996 Summer Olympics
Asian Games medalists in swimming
Swimmers at the 1990 Asian Games
Swimmers at the 1994 Asian Games
Universiade medalists in swimming
Asian Games gold medalists for South Korea
Asian Games bronze medalists for South Korea
Medalists at the 1990 Asian Games
Medalists at the 1994 Asian Games
Universiade gold medalists for South Korea
Universiade bronze medalists for South Korea
Medalists at the 1995 Summer Universiade
Medalists at the 1997 Summer Universiade
People from Goesan County
Sportspeople from North Chungcheong Province